Raise a Native (April 18, 1961 – July 28, 1988) was an undefeated Thoroughbred racehorse that was named 1963 champion two-year-old colt in the Turf and Sport Digest poll and was the highest rated juvenile in the Experimental Free Handicap. He sired 74 stakes winners, including Majestic Prince and Alydar. In its 1988 obituary for the horse, The New York Times called him "the most influential sire of American Thoroughbred stallions over the last 20 years".

Breeding
Raise a Native was bred by Happy Hill Farm, owned by Cortright Wetherill (1923–1988) and his wife Ella Anne Widener (1928–1986), whose Widener family of Philadelphia is one of the most prominent in American Thoroughbred racing history. Raise a Native was by the 1954 United States Horse of the Year Native Dancer, who was ranked #7 by the Blood-Horse magazine listing of the top 100 U.S. Thoroughbred champions of the 20th Century. His dam was the good stakes winner Raise You, by Case Ace. Raise a Native was sold as a weanling to Mrs. E. H. Augustus for a record sum of $22,000 ($,000 inflation adjusted). He was later bought by Louis Wolfson as a yearling in 1962 for $39,000 ($,000 inflation adjusted) and moved to Wolfson's Harbor View Farm in 1963.

Racing record
Trained by future Hall of Fame inductee Burley Parke, as a two-year-old Raise a Native was undefeated in four starts and set or equaled track records three times. He won the sprint races the Great American Stakes and the Belmont Juvenile and was voted American Champion Two-Year-Old Colt by Turf & Sports Digest. The rival Daily Racing Form and Thoroughbred Racing Association polls were topped by Hurry to Market.

Stud record
After ending his racing career due to a bowed tendon in 1963, Raise a Native was bought by Spendthrift Farm, a breeding syndicate in Lexington, Kentucky. Although the descendants of Raise a Native have had success racing on turf in Europe, they generally have been more attuned to running on dirt.

Among his offspring, he sired Alydar (who was a close second to Affirmed in all three Triple Crown races), Crowned Prince (who won the Dewhurst Stakes), Exclusive Native (who won the Arlington Classic), Mr. Prospector (who is a leading sire), and Majestic Prince (who won the Kentucky Derby and Preakness Stakes).

He is notably the grandsire of Triple Crown winner Affirmed, Kentucky Derby winning filly Genuine Risk, Kentucky Derby and Preakness Stakes winner Alysheba, Queen's Plate winning filly Dancethruthedawn, Belmont Stakes winner Easy Goer, Breeders' Cup Sprint winner Gulch, Kentucky Derby winner Fusaichi Pegasus, Belmont Stakes winner Coastal, undefeated Meadowlake, Belmont Stakes winner Conquistador Cielo, Horse of the Year Criminal Type, Kentucky Derby winner Strike the Gold, and Grade 1 winner Smart Strike.

Raise A Native is also the great-great-grandsire of two champions. The first is two time Horse of the Year Curlin, who won the 2007 Preakness Stakes and Breeders Cup Classic and 2008 Dubai World Cup, and the second is champion mare Zenyatta, winner of the 2008 Breeders' Cup Ladies Classic and 2009 Breeders' Cup Classic. He is also the great-great-grandsire of 2008 Breeders' Cup Classic winner Raven's Pass.

As of 2022, 22 Kentucky Derby winners are direct descendents of the Raise A Native sire line: Rich Strike, Country House, American Pharoah, Always Dreaming, I'll Have Another, Super Saver, Street Sense, Smarty Jones, Funny Cide, War Emblem, Monarchos, Mine That Bird, Fusaichi Pegasus, Real Quiet, Grindstone, Thunder Gulch, Strike the Gold, Unbridled, Alysheba, Genuine Risk, Affirmed, and Majestic Prince. Seven Kentucky Derby winners are out of mares which are also direct descendents of the Raise a Native sire line: Barbaro, Orb, California Chrome, Authentic, Mandaloun, Rich Strike  and Mine that Bird, the latter two carrying him in both paternal and maternal sire lines. The 2018 Triple Crown winner, Justify, carries 4 crosses of Raise A Native in his pedigree (6x4x7x6) whilst Nyquist, the 2016 Kentucky Derby winner, is related through his grand-dam Seeking Regina, a great-granddaughter of Raise A Native.

On July 28, 1988, Raise a Native was humanely euthanized at Spendthrift Farm due to spinal deterioration.

Pedigree

See also
 List of leading Thoroughbred racehorses

References

External links
"Raise a Native Destroyed." The New York Times 30 July 1988 - Retrieved 11 July 2007
"Parke's Patience a Classic For All Time" Thoroughbred Times - April 24, 2004
"Wolfson...Dead at 95" Thoroughbred Times - December 31, 2007

1961 racehorse births
1988 racehorse deaths
Racehorses bred in Kentucky
Racehorses trained in the United States
United States Champion Thoroughbred Sires
Horse racing track record setters
Thoroughbred family 8-f
Chefs-de-Race